Hollowaya is a genus of tiger moths in the family Erebidae and is strictly endemic for New Caledonia.

Species
Hollowaya lateritica (Holloway, 1979)
Hollowaya lifuensis (Rothschild, 1910)

References
 , 2010: Hollowaya - a new tiger-moth genus from New Caledonia (Lepidoptera, Arctiidae). Atalanta 41 (3/4): 157-158.
 , 1979: A survey of the Lepidoptera, biogeography and ecology of New Caledonia. Series Entomologica. 15: XII+588 p.
 , 1910: Catalogue of the Arctianae in the Tring museum, with notes and descriptions of new species. Novitates Zoologicae 17 (1): 1-85, (2): 113-188, pl. XI-XIV, 18: pl. III-VI, London and Aylesbury.
Natural History Museum Lepidoptera generic names catalog

Spilosomina
Moth genera